Geofrey Kayemba Ssolo  is a Ugandan talent music manager, football agent,  businessman and  politician. He serves as a Member of Parliament representing   Bukomansimbi South Constituency  in Bukomansimbi. He was elected on 14 January 2021.  He is a member of National Unity Platform political party.  He serves as the Shadow Minister of Sports in the Shadow Cabinet.

Early life & education background
Kayemba  was born on 1 August 1983 in Bukomansimbi district to Francis Jjuuko Kamulegeya (father) and Resty Nabumpenje (mother). He attended St. Charles Lwanga Primary School Kyabakuza, Masaka Secondary School for S.1 & S.2, St. Damian Kilyamenvu Bukomansimbi, he sat his o level exams from Benard College Kisweera Masaka  &  Happy Hours Secondary School Kampala for A levels (2009). He holds an Advanced Certificate in Education and a bachelor's degree in public relations management from Ndejje University.

Career

Talent managing
In his vacation he taught at Kamaanda Primary School Bukomansimbi and while in A level Kayemba was a part time cleaner at Mulago Hospital working under Norema Services Cleaning Company.
In 2005, he worked as a marketer at DCL studio. He is the CEO of Just Fine Agency  a company that manages musicians as well as he serves as a football agent at Africa Sports Agency  a  Football Agency  Company.   He started artiste managing in 2006 managing Lady Mariam Tindatine, Qute Kaye, Dr. Hilderman, Wilson Bugembe, David Lutalo, Christopher Evans, Rema Namakula among others.  In 2016, Kayemba was certified as a football agent by FUFA. He has represented Godfrey Walusimbi, Emmanuel Okwi, Khalid Aucho, Chrizestorm Ntambi, Herman Wasswa among others.

Politics
In  January 2021, Kayemba was elected as a Member of Parliament  representing  Bukomansimbi South  Constituency  in  the eleventh Parliament of Uganda (2021 to 2026)  in the 2021 Ugandan general elections and on 21 May 2021 he sworn in as the Member of Parliament. He won with 9200 votes.  On 25 June 2021,  he was appointed  as the Shadow Minister of Sports in the Parliament of Uganda.

Personal life
He is a member of  the National Unity Platform political party.

References

External references
Website of the Parliament of Uganda.

Living people
1983 births
People from Masaka District
21st-century Ugandan politicians
People from Central Region, Uganda
Members of the Parliament of Uganda